Foxfire is a 1987 Hallmark Hall of Fame made-for-television drama film starring Jessica Tandy, Hume Cronyn and John Denver, based on the 1980 play of the same name. The movie aired on CBS on December 13, 1987. Tandy won an Emmy Award for her performance.

References

External links

1987 television films
1987 films
1987 drama films
Hallmark Hall of Fame episodes
Peabody Award-winning broadcasts
American films based on plays
CBS network films
Films directed by Jud Taylor
American drama television films
1980s English-language films
1980s American films